Wayne Dyer (born 24 November 1977) is a former professional footballer who played as a midfielder. Born in England, he represented the Montserrat national team at international level.

Dyer notably scored Montserrat's first goal in FIFA World Cup qualification when he scored in the 88th minute of a 2002 FIFA World Cup qualification home leg against the Dominican Republic on 19 March 2000. The match was played in Port of Spain, Trinidad as the only pitch in Montserrat was unusable due to volcanic activity. Montserrat lost 3–1 and lost both games 6–1 on aggregate. In June 2011, after a gap of seven years he appeared again for his national team in a World Cup qualifying match against Belize.

In England, Dyer played for Birmingham City, Oxford United, Walsall, Stevenage Borough, and before Bromsgrove, Hinckley United, Stourbridge, Solihull Borough, Kettering Town and Chesham United.

Career
Dyer joined Hednesford Town in October 2007 after two seasons at Bromsgrove Rovers, with the move to Keys Park covered in a recent edition of British football publication FourFourTwo magazine.

He moved to Chasetown but was loaned to Coleshill Town in October 2008 where he played three matches.

He then moved to Redditch United in the Conference North after moving from Barwell where he made 13 appearances in all, six in the league, scoring one goal—a diving header in the second minute of second half stoppage time to give Barwell a 2–1 victory over Grantham Town on 4 September 2010 after coming on a substitute.

Dyer made his first appearance for Redditch against Gainsborough Trinity on 6 November 2010. He went on to make ten appearances for Redditch, all in the league, with nine starts and one substitute appearance, before being released in February 2011.

In July 2011 he joined Romulus.

Dyer's younger brother Lloyd is also a professional footballer.

Career statistics
Scores and results list Montserrat's goal tally first, score column indicates score after each Dyer goal.

References

External links

1977 births
Living people
Montserrat international footballers
Montserratian footballers
Birmingham City F.C. players
Oxford United F.C. players
Walsall F.C. players
Hereford United F.C. players
Kettering Town F.C. players
Stevenage F.C. players
Hinckley United F.C. players
Bromsgrove Rovers F.C. players
Chasetown F.C. players
Sutton Coldfield Town F.C. players
Barwell F.C. players
Redditch United F.C. players
Association football midfielders
Black British sportspeople
Romulus F.C. players
Evesham United F.C. players
Coleshill Town F.C. players
Bedford Town F.C. players
Stourbridge F.C. players
Solihull Borough F.C. players
Chesham United F.C. players
Bedworth United F.C. players
Barry Town United F.C. players
Kingstonian F.C. players
Moor Green F.C. players
Nuneaton Borough F.C. players
English people of Montserratian descent